Karl William Ouimette (born June 18, 1992) is a Canadian professional soccer player who plays as a defender for Atlético Ottawa of the Canadian Premier League.

Club career
Ouimette played with the Trois-Rivières Attak, an affiliate of the Montreal Impact, in the Canadian Soccer League in 2009 and 2010.

Montreal Impact

On July 5, 2012, Ouimette signed a professional contract with the Montreal Impact, making him the first Academy player to sign with the senior squad.  A couple weeks after being signed, Ouimette made his professional soccer debut in a league match against the Houston Dynamo.  Ouimette came on as a substitute for Zarek Valentin in the 26th minute.  Montreal went on to lose the match 3–0.

On October 19, 2013, Karl Ouimette scored his first MLS goal and game winner in a comeback 2–1 victory over the Philadelphia Union.  The goal proved to be decisive to allow the Montreal Impact enter the MLS Cup playoffs for the first time in the team history. Ouimette also started both legs of the 2014 Canadian Championship helping the club to its second straight Canadian title. On February 6, 2015, Ouimette was waived by Montreal, effectively ending his time with the Impact.

New York Red Bulls

After an extended trial with MLS side New York Red Bulls, Ouimette was signed to a deal on March 4, 2015. The move reunited him with former Impact coach, Jesse Marsch. Ouimette's debut for the Red Bulls first team came against the New England Revolution on May 2, 2015.

Ouimette was loaned to affiliate side New York Red Bulls II during the 2015 season and made his debut for the side as part of the starting eleven on April 4, 2015, in a 4–1 victory over Toronto FC II, the first victory in club history. On June 23, 2015, Ouimette was selected to the USL Team of the Week for his performance for NYRBII in a 2–0 victory over Louisville City FC. On September 26, 2015, Ouimette scored two goals in extra time to help New York Red Bulls II to a 4–2 victory over Pittsburgh Riverhounds, advancing New York in the 2015 USL Playoffs.

Ouimette was released by the Red Bulls at the end of the 2016 season.

Jacksonville Armada (loan)
On June 24, 2016, Ouimette joined Jacksonville Armada on loan until the end of the 2016 season.

San Francisco Deltas
In January 2017, Ouimette signed with San Francisco Deltas of the NASL Ouimette would win the 2017 Soccer Bowl with the Deltas in their inaugural season. The Deltas would cease operations three days after winning the Soccer Bowl, leaving Ouimette to look for a new club.

Indy Eleven
On February 2, 2018, Ouimette signed with USL side Indy Eleven for the 2018 season. In 2018, Ouimette would make 32 starts for the club, playing the most minutes with 2842, and would score three goal. In 2019, he would make 29 starts for the club in 2019, and score three goals, including a playoff goal against New York Red Bulls II. He would re-sign for a third season with the club in 2020, and for a fourth season with the club in 2021.
 Ouimette would be named vice-captain for the 2021 season, and would play in his 100th game with the club during the season. In November 2021, it was announced Ouimette would return for a fifth season with Indy Eleven. On March 19, 2022, Ouimette became the first player in Indy Eleven history to earn 100 starts with his selection in a 2-0 loss to the Tampa Bay Rowdies. He was released by Indy Eleven on November 30, 2022, following the conclusion of the 2022 season.

Detroit City FC (loan)
On May 2, 2022, Detroit City FC announced its acquisition of Ouimette on loan from Indy Eleven for the remainder of the 2022 USL Championship season.

Atlético Ottawa
On January 31, 2023, Atlético Ottawa announced Ouimette had signed a two-year contract with the club ahead of the 2023 Canadian Premier League season.

International career
On November 8, 2013, Ouimette received his first call up to the Canadian national team by manager Benito Floro for two friendlies against Czech Republic on November 15 and Slovenia on November 19, 2013. He received his first cap as a substitute against Slovenia. He was substituted into Canada's September 9, 2014 match against Jamaica in the 88th minute. The match was dedicated to his sister, Julie, who died a few days earlier after a 12-year battle with Philadelphia chromosome-positive acute lymphoblastic leukemia.

Career statistics

Club

International

Honors

Club
Trois-Rivières Attak
Canadian Soccer League Champion (1): 2009

Montreal Impact
Canadian Championship (2): 2013, 2014

New York Red Bulls
MLS Supporters' Shield (1): 2015

References

External links
 
 
 

1992 births
Living people
People from Repentigny, Quebec
Canadian soccer players
Canadian expatriate soccer players
Association football defenders
Montreal Impact U23 players
Trois-Rivières Attak players
CF Montréal players
New York Red Bulls players
New York Red Bulls II players
Jacksonville Armada FC players
San Francisco Deltas players
Indy Eleven players
Detroit City FC players
Canadian Soccer League (1998–present) players
Major League Soccer players
USL Championship players
North American Soccer League players
Canada men's youth international soccer players
Canada men's international soccer players
Expatriate soccer players in the United States
2015 CONCACAF Gold Cup players
Canadian expatriate sportspeople in the United States
Homegrown Players (MLS)
Atlético Ottawa players